Mariä Heimsuchung (Church of the Visitation of the Blessed Virgin Mary) is a Catholic parish church in Munich, Germany. It was built from 1933 to 1934  in neo-Romanesque style by Oswald Bieber and government architect  William Hollweck. The new building was necessary due to the strong growth of the mother parish of St. Rupert.

The Visitation of Mary to Elizabeth is shown on the relief over the portal of the church.

References

External links 
 Photos of Mariä Heimsuchung

Roman Catholic churches in Munich
Roman Catholic churches completed in 1934
Cultural heritage monuments in Munich
1934 establishments in Germany
20th-century Roman Catholic church buildings in Germany